The first series of The Bill, a British television drama, consisted of eleven episodes, broadcast between 16 October 1984 and 22 January 1985.

Artichoke Hill - Sun Hill Police Station Set and Location Filming
Whilst Woodentop used a traditional three-wall set built at Thames Television's studios at Teddington, for the series, Sun Hill Police Station was created by converting the premises of a two-storey former cigarette packing company on the corner of Artichoke Hill and Pennington Street, in Wapping, East London.

The police station was significantly smaller than subsequent versions, with almost-all of the interior offices being seen on-screen - Only the original packing/warehouse area alongside the rear yard not featuring. Production offices doubled with some of the sets, with the canteen being used by cast and crew, and notably Chief Superintendent Brownlow's office actually being that of producer Michael Chapman. When shooting was taking place upstairs, the production team were unable to continue typing or to take phone calls. 

Located in the shadow of the towering wall that surrounded the then-disused Tobacco Dock, and alongside the cobbles of Pennington Street, the nondescript 1950's building was very much in an East-End setting. Fronting onto the short stretch of road called Artichoke Hill, road signs were simply covered with those reading Sun Hill when exterior filming was taking place.

The use of real buildings instead of traditional sets within TV studios was very unusual at that time, with Channel Four's "Brookside" being one of the few others then to do so. Hand-held video cameras allowed the actors to move from within the building directly onto the street - Something that was just not possible with traditional studio-based production and created a new degree of realism for the viewer.

Many of the crew enjoyed the autonomy of working at Thames' East London outpost, however transport links to the area were then very poor and many of the Teddington-based staff disliked the cross-city journey from West London. This remained a constant at Artichoke Hill, and may have been a factor in the choice of a West-London location when the filming base was forced to move for Series 3.

Many of the cast and crew shared their memories of making this first series for the book Witness Statements, including stars John Salthouse, Eric Richard, Trudie Goodwin, Mark Wingett, Peter Ellis, Nula Conwell, Jon Iles, Larry Dann, Colin Blumenau, Robert Hudson and Ashley Gunstock; along with costume designer Jennie Tate, stage managers Nigel Wilson and Marilyn Edwards, floor manager Julian Meers, production manager Derek Cotty, designer Philip Blowers, writer & technical advisor Barry Appleton and director Peter Cregeen.

Cast and Character Changes
Although the series is a continuation of the one-off play, a number of casting and character changes were made.

The character of Sergeant Wilding changes name to Sergeant Cryer, and was recast with Eric Richard replacing Peter Dean. Since the transmission of "Woodentop", Dean had secured the role of Pete Beale in EastEnders, following the re-casting of the original choice, Leslie Grantham, as Den Watts.

Robert Pugh, who had appeared as DI Galloway, decided shortly before production was due to begin that he did not want to commit to a series and the role was recast with John Salthouse.

The senior uniformed officer, Inspector Deeping, was replaced with Chief Superintendent Brownlow, played by Peter Ellis. Ellis had auditioned originally for one of the CID characters, but was felt to be too old.

PC Morgan's name was changed to PC Edwards, although still played by Colin Blumenau.

Larry Dann was offered the part of Sergeant Alec Peters the day before filming of the first episode, after the actor originally cast in the role repeatedly forgot his lines. 

Both Jon Iles (DC Dashwood) and Tony Scannell (DS Roach) were initially booked to appear in only two episodes.

The original casting was the responsibility of Pat O'Connell, and there is a strong link with some of the original male cast appearing in successful plays at the Royal Court Theatre in London during early 1983. John Salthouse and Eric Richard took the lead roles in the Martin Allen play Red Saturday, and Gary Olsen, Mark Wingett and Robert Pugh all appeared in "Welcome Home".

Industrial Dispute - Impact on Production & Transmission
During 1984 a dispute between Thames Television and the technician's union, the ACTT led to a series of strikes which impacted the production and transmission on the ITV network of the first series.

The first series was due to consist of twelve episodes, but only eleven were fully completed. Scenes had already been shot for the missing episode, which was later completed as "The Chief Super's Party", with some rewriting reflecting cast changes, as the final episode of Series Two. In addition, a publicity photo featuring DI Galloway at a kitchen table, surrounded by food was also released within a Series One press pack, though the scene does not feature in any transmitted episodes.

The episodes "A Friend in Need" and "Clutching at Straws" were transmitted in their usual 9.00pm Tuesday slots on 23 & 30 October 1984, in the Thames TV (London) region only, as technicians had walked-out, leaving management to run the service. ACTT members in the other ITV companies supported their London-based colleagues by refusing to transmit Thames output across the network, so these episodes were shown in all other ITV regions on 29 January and 5 February 1985, a  week after the last episode "The Sweet Smell of Failure" had been broadcast. Viewers in the Thames region saw two repeated episodes of “The Sweeney” on these two weeks.

The Bill Titles & End Credits
The first series used the well-known "walking feet" sequence to close, but also a related sequence of the officers walking toward the camera with just the police officer's caps visible as opening titles. This is intercut with still-photos of nearby locations to the production base including, Breezer's Hill, Metropolitan Wharf, Wapping Wall, Glamis Road & Leman Street.

Pennington Street in Wapping is the location of the cobbles that the officers walk along. Subsequent updates of the end credits continued to be shot there, even when the production base moved to other locations from 1986.

Actors Karen England and Paul Page-Hanson are the male and female officers. Both appear as extras in the first series.

Main characters

 PC Jim Carver - Mark Wingett
 PC Dave Litten - Gary Olsen
 PC Taffy Edwards - Colin Blumenau
 PC Reg Hollis - Jeff Stewart
 PC Robin Frank - Ashley Gunstock
 PC Yorkie Smith - Robert Hudson
 WPC June Ackland - Trudie Goodwin
 WPC Viv Martella - Nula Conwell
 Sgt. Jack Wilding - Peter Dean
 Sgt. Bob Cryer - Eric Richard
 Sgt. Tom Penny - Roger Leach
 Sgt. Alec Peters - Larry Dann
 Insp. Sam Deeping - Jon Croft
 DC Mike Dashwood - Jon Iles
 DS Ted Roach - Tony Scannell
 DI Roy Galloway - John Salthouse
 Ch. Supt. Charles Brownlow - Peter Ellis

Minor characters
 Duty Sgt. - Chris Jenkinson
 Duty Sgt. Crossland - Phillip Rowlands
 Duty Det. Sgt. - Neil Conrich
 Duty Det. Sgt. Danes - Trevor Cooper
 Duty PC - Richard Huw
 Duty PC - Pat Gorman
 Duty PC Peters - Greg Cruttwell
 Duty PC Fox - Gary Raynsford
 Duty WPC Picton - Tessa Bell-Briggs
 Complaints Department DCI Kirk - Ray Armstrong
 Complaints Department DI Wheeler - Michael N. Harbour
 WPC - Vicki Gee-Dare (Uncredited)
 PC Tony Stamp - Graham Cole (Uncredited PC throughout series 1–3, before becoming a full-time cast member in series 4)
 Scenes of Crime Officer - Ralph Watson (Funny Ol' Business - Cops & Robbers, It's Not Such a Bad Job After All, A Dangerous Breed)

Episodes

References

1984 British television seasons
1985 British television seasons
The Bill series